

References

2000
Films
Cambodian